The men's double sculls competition at the 1956 Summer Olympics took place on Lake Wendouree, Ballarat, Australia. The event was held from 23 to 27 November.

Heats
The winner in each heat qualified for the finals. The others must compete in the repechage.

Heat 1

Heat 2

First repechage
The winner in each heat qualified for the finals.

Heat 1

Heat 2

Final

References

External links

Rowing at the 1956 Summer Olympics